Grandes Hits is the first greatest hits collection released from Mexican singer Cristian Castro. It was released on September 10, 2002 by BMG. The compilation featured three never released tracks from Cristian.

Track listing

Sales and certifications

References

Cristian Castro compilation albums
2002 greatest hits albums
Bertelsmann Music Group compilation albums
Spanish-language compilation albums